Beehive Field is a stadium in New Britain, Connecticut.  The ballpark has a capacity of 4,700.  It is primarily used for baseball and was the home of the New Britain Red Sox (Boston Red Sox AA affiliate) from the time of their move to the city in 1983 until moving next door to New Britain Stadium for the 1995 season.  The Eastern League All-Star Game was played before 3,106 fans on June 29, 1987, with league-MVP Mark Grace and game-MVP Dwight Smith representing the Pittsfield Cubs. The Hartford Hawks baseball program used the venue for some home games prior to opening Fiondella Field in 2006.

Beehive Field is now used primarily by New Britain High School baseball and softball teams.

References

Baseball venues in Connecticut
Minor league baseball venues
High school baseball venues in the United States
Buildings and structures in New Britain, Connecticut
Sports venues in Hartford County, Connecticut
Hartford Yard Goats
Hartford Hawks baseball
College baseball venues in the United States
Softball venues in the United States
1983 establishments in Connecticut
Sports venues completed in 1983
Sports in New Britain, Connecticut